is a city tram station located on the Man'yōsen Shinminatokō Line in Imizu, Toyama Prefecture, Japan. This station is unmanned.

Structure
The station is served by one track with platforms on its both sides.

Surrounding area
Kaiōmaru Park

See also
Kaiwo Maru II

Railway stations in Toyama Prefecture